The Beach Boys: An American Band is a 1985 biographical musical film directed by Malcolm Leo. The movie is a biography of the American rock band the Beach Boys, with interviews, concert footage and clips from movies and television shows in which they appeared.

The documentary featured some previously unreleased music, including an excerpt of "The Elements: Fire", as well as a segment extracted from the group's Home Movies project.

References

External links
 

1985 films
An American Band
Films directed by Malcolm Leo
Documentary films about musical groups
1980s English-language films
1980s American films